Phoenix is a white variety of grape of German origin used for wine. It was created by Dr. Gerhardt Alleweldt (1927–2005) at the Geilweilerhof Institute for Grape Breeding in Siebeldingen in 1964, by crossing the Vitis vinifera variety Bacchus with the hybrid grape Villard Blanc.

It is grown in small quantities in regions such as Belgium and the 
UK. At the Royal Horticultural Society's Wisley Garden, Phoenix is used together with the Orion grape to produce a dry white wine.

Synonyms
Phoenix is also known under its breeding code Geilweilerhof GA-49-22 or Gf. GA-49-22.

References

Hybrid grape varieties